The University Place School District #83, located in the City of University Place, WA between Tacoma, WA and Puget Sound, was officially established on November 2, 1895.

The district includes most of University Place and portions of Fircrest and Tacoma.

Student enrollment in October 2009 was 5,616.

Schools 
 Chambers Primary
 Sunset Primary
 University Place Primary
 Evergreen Primary
 Narrows View Intermediate
 Drum Intermediate
 Curtis Junior High School
 Curtis Senior High School

References

External links

School districts in Washington (state)
Education in Pierce County, Washington